Peter Tschentscher (born 20 January 1966) is a German politician of the Social Democratic Party (SPD). Since 28 March 2018 he has been the First Mayor of Hamburg. As First Mayor, he is head of the Senate Tschentscher. Since 2008 he has been a member of the Hamburg Parliament. From 2011 until 2018 he served as State Minister of Finance in the first and second governments of Olaf Scholz.

Early life and education
Tschentscher graduated from high school in Oldenburg in 1985. He later studied medicine and molecular biology at the University of Hamburg, where he received his Doctor of Medicine degree in 1995. From 1994 until 2008 he practised as a physician at the University Medical Center Hamburg-Eppendorf.

Political career

Tschentscher joined the Social Democratic Party in 1989. He was first elected to the Hamburgische Bürgerschaft in the 2008 state elections. From 2008 until 2011 he served on the Budget Committee. In addition, he led a parliamentary inquiry into cost overruns in the construction of the Elbphilharmonie from 2010.

Finance Senator, 2011–2018
During his tenure as State Minister of Finance Tschentscher oversaw the privatization of the publicly owned shipping finance provider HSH Nordbank.

From 2015 on, Tschentscher was one of the state's representatives at the Bundesrat, where he served as deputy chairman of the finance committee.

First mayor of Hamburg, 2018–present
In March 2018 Tschentscher succeeded Olaf Scholz, who left state politics to become Federal Minister of Finance and Vice Chancellor of Germany in the fourth coalition government of Chancellor Angela Merkel.

At the time of his nomination, Tschentscher was seen as a surprising choice by many, as he has not appeared much in the public during his term as Senator of Finance. Andreas Dressel, SPD parliamentary group leader in Hamburg, had been considered by many as obvious successor of Scholz, but declined for personal reasons.

As one of the state's representatives at the Bundesrat, Tschentscher is a member of the Committee on Foreign Affairs and on the Committee on European Affairs. He is also a member of the German-Polish Friendship Group set up in cooperation with the Senate of Poland. During his first year as mayor, he served as Commissioner of the Federal Republic of Germany for Cultural Affairs under the Treaty on Franco-German Cooperation.

In the negotiations to form a so-called traffic light coalition of the SPD, the Green Party and the Free Democratic Party (FDP) following the 2021 federal elections, Tschentscher was part of his party's delegation in the working group on economic affairs, co-chaired by Carsten Schneider, Cem Özdemir and Michael Theurer.

Tschentscher was nominated by his party as delegate to the Federal Convention for the purpose of electing the President of Germany in 2022.

Other activities

Corporate boards
 HafenCity Hamburg GmbH, ex officio chairman of the supervisory board (since 2018)

Non-profit organizations
 Business Forum of the Social Democratic Party of Germany, Member of the Political Advisory Board (since 2020)
 Stability Council, ex officio member
 Haus Rissen, Member of the Board of Trustees
 Deutsches Museum, Member of the Board of Trustees

References

External links

|-

Living people
1966 births
Chemical pathologists
Mayors of Hamburg
Senators of Hamburg
Members of the Hamburg Parliament
Presidents of the German Bundesrat
Social Democratic Party of Germany politicians
Politicians from Bremen